Niraj Acharya also known as Akki Sharma  (born June 14, 1991) is a Nepali visual effects artist and film editor, who has won LG Film Award as The Best VFX of the year 2016 for Champion (Nepali movie).

Early life
Sharma was born in Jhapa, Nepal. He worked for several project and companies as a Visual effects artist and Film Editor.

Filmography

Awards and nominations

References

External links 
 

1991 births
Nepalese animators
Living people
Visual effects artists
Nepalese animated film directors
Nepalese television directors
Nepali film award winners
Nepalese film editors
People from Jhapa District